Persatuan Sepakbola Magetan (simply known as Persemag Magetan) is an Indonesian football club based in Magetan, East Java. They currently compete in the Liga 3.

History
Persemag was founded in 1977 as Asosiasi Sepakbola Magetan (ASMAG). In 1989, ASMAG change its name to Persemag.
Persemag best achievement was in 2000 when they managed to advance to Liga Indonesia First Division. But it didn't last long, Persemag falling down and now they are playing in the Liga 3 East Java Region.

References

External links
 

Football clubs in Indonesia
Football clubs in East Java
Association football clubs established in 1977
1977 establishments in Indonesia